Viviane Gouverneur (born 1940) is a French former freestyle swimmer. She competed in two events at the 1956 Summer Olympics.

References

External links
 

1940 births
Living people
French female freestyle swimmers
Olympic swimmers of France
Swimmers at the 1956 Summer Olympics
Place of birth missing (living people)
20th-century French women
21st-century French women